The Ulster History Circle is a heritage organisation that administers Blue Plaques for the area that encompasses the province of Ulster on the island of Ireland. It is a voluntary, not-for-profit organisation, placing commemorative plaques in public places in honour of people and locations that have contributed to all genres of history within the boundary of the Irish province of Ulster, or contemporary country of Northern Ireland. Founded in the early 1980s, the group receives no government funding, unlike many similar organisations in the United Kingdom.

Doreen Corcoran served as chair of the Circle from 1998 to 2009.

Blue Plaques recipients in Ulster
Since the first plaque was formally unveiled over 150 individuals have been honoured, including:
Cecil Frances Alexander, hymn writer
Mabel Annesley, artist and wood engraver
Thomas Andrews, designer of RMS Titanic
Joe Bambrick, soccer player
Samuel Beckett, playwright
Samuel Black, pioneer cardiologist
Lilian Bland, pioneer aviator
Edward Bunting, folk music collector
Margaret Byers, educationalist
Daniel Cambridge, soldier and recipient of the Victoria Cross
Joseph Campbell, poet
Joseph W. Carey, painter
Amy Carmichael, missionary and writer
Joyce Cary, novelist
Francis Rawdon Chesney, soldier and explorer
Margaret Clarke, artist
Edward Coey, mayor of Belfast and philanthropist
Mabel Calhoun, photographer, teacher and archaeologist

William Conor, artist
Kathleen Coyle, writer
James Humbert Craig, artist
James Bell Crichton, soldier and recipient of the Victoria Cross
William Crolly, Archbishop of Armagh
James Deeny, public health pioneer 
Edmund De Wind, soldier and recipient of the Victoria Cross
George Dickson, rose grower
William Steel Dickson, United Irishman
John Dill, soldier
Gerard Dillon, artist
James Dilworth, New Zealand farmer, investor, speculator and philanthropist
William Drennan, physician and radical
John Boyd Dunlop, tyre inventor
Timothy Eaton, businessman
William John English, soldier and recipient of the Victoria Cross
E. Estyn Evans, geographer
Harry Ferguson, inventor
Vere Henry Lewis Foster, educationalist
William Gibson, goldsmith and philanthropist
Sarah Grand, novelist and suffragette
W. A. Green, photographer
Paul Henry, artist
Robert Mitchell Henry, academic
John Hewitt, poet
Chaim Herzog, sixth President of Israel
The Huguenot Community
Barney Hughes, master baker and philanthropist
Brian Desmond Hurst, film director
Francis Hutcheson, philosopher and teacher
Alexander Irvine, writer
Otto Jaffe, Lord Mayor of Belfast 1899 and 1904 and philanthropist
James Johnston, tenor
Samuel Kelly, coal importer and philanthropist
Kellys Cellars, meeting place of the United Irishmen
John King, explorer
Charles Lanyon, architect
Philip Larkin, poet
John Lavery, painter
Charles Lever, novelist
C. S. Lewis, author
Charles Davis Lucas, naval officer and first recipient of the Victoria Cross
John Luke, artist
Robert Wilson Lynd, writer
Robert Shipboy MacAdam, antiquarian and Gaelic scholar
Aodh Mac Aingil, scholar, poet and bishop
George Macartney, 1st Earl Macartney, diplomat
Thomas McCabe and William Putnam McCabe, United Irishmen
Luke Livingston Macassey, civil engineer and barrister
Samuel McCaughey, sheep farmer and politician
John Macoun, explorer and naturalist
Henry Joy McCracken, United Irishman
Mary Ann McCracken, social reformer
James MacCullagh, mathematician and physicist
Charles McKimm, first General Superinendant of Parks for the City of Belfast
Michael McLaverty, writer
Louis MacNeice, poet
Martha Magee, benefactor
James Joseph Magennis, submariner and recipient of the Victoria Cross
Guglielmo Marconi, radio pioneer
W. F. Marshall, preacher and poet
Colin Middleton, artist
Rinty Monaghan, World Champion boxer
James Murray, inventor of milk of magnesia
Andrew Nicholl, painter
Sister Nivedita (Margaret Elizabeth Noble), writer and Indian nationalist
Cathal O'Byrne, singer, poet and writer
Stewart Parker, playwright
H. B. Phillips, impresario
Sir Henry Pottinger, 1st Baronet, first Governor of Hong Kong
Robert Lloyd Praeger, naturalist and historian
Rosamond Praeger, sculptor
Robert Quigg, soldier and recipient of the Victoria Cross
William Ritchie, pioneer shipbuilder
Robert the Bruce, King of the Scots
Paul Rodgers, shipbuilder
Richard Rowley, poet
George William Russell, writer, poet and artist
George Shiels, playwright
Sir Robert Staples, 12th Baronet, artist
George Vesey Stewart, pioneer New Zealand settler
Robert Sullivan, educationalist
Jonathan Swift, cleric and writer
Hugh Thomson, illustrator
William Thomson, 1st Baron Kelvin, scientist
Anthony Trollope, novelist
Helen Waddell, poet and writer
Sir Richard Wallace, 1st Baronet, philanthropist and art collector
Ernest Walton, physicist and Nobel Laureate
George Stuart White, soldier and recipient of the Victoria Cross
William Whitla, physician and politician
Oscar Wilde, playwright and poet
Guy Wilson, daffodil breeder
John Butler Yeats, artist and writer
James Young, actor and comedian
Annie Russell Maunder, astronomer

References

External links
 Ulster History Circle plaques recorded on openplaques.org

Non-profit organisations based in Northern Ireland
History of Northern Ireland

Culture of Northern Ireland
Ulster
Blue plaques